Blue Mercedes were a pop music duo from London, England, comprising David Titlow and Duncan Millar. Their debut album, Rich and Famous, was produced by Phil Harding and Ian Curnow for PWL, with songs written by Titlow and Millar. "It was dance pop, out and out; it needed to work on the dance floor," recalled Harding of actioning the brief given to him by the band.

Their song "I Want to Be Your Property" was a Billboard Hot 100 hit, peaking at #66 in 1988, and they achieved additional success on the US Dance Charts where they spent four weeks at #1 on the Hot Dance Club Play chart.

"Love is the Gun" peaked at #46 in the UK national chart and #5 on the Hot Dance Club Play chart.  "Love Is The Gun" was Smash Hits "Single of the Fortnight" in June 1988.

"See Want Must Have" reached #18 in the Hot Dance Club Play chart, and in the UK "I Want To Be Your Property" reached #23 in the national chart.

After releasing the single "That Beauty Is You", they evolved into the indie dance band Nixon and released the song "Sweet Temptation". Later, they released a number of dance tracks under the name Monica De Luxe, which entered UK Dance Charts.

Titlow then went on to form the indie rock band Heave, who released one album entitled Scaramanga on Radar Records in the early 1990s and is now a fashion and music photographer.

Millar went on to produce further dance tracks including, as Exoterix, the first track released by EMI dance label Positiva Records in 1993. Later, he released an acid jazz instrumental album under the name A One, on Indochina Records (subsidiary label of China Records), and two smooth jazz albums on Instinct Records, N.Y.C., achieving a UK MOBO nomination as Best UK Jazz Act for the first of these in 1999.

Discography

Singles

as Nixon [MCA Records - NXN 1]

Albums

See also
List of Number 1 Dance Hits (United States)
List of artists who reached number one on the US Dance chart
One-hit wonders in the UK

References

External links
 Duncan Millar's website
 David Titlow's website

English pop music duos
Musical groups from London
English dance music groups